Three Sisters is a 2020 South Korean drama film, written and directed by Lee Seung-won. Starring Moon So-ri, Kim Sun-young and Jang Yoon-ju, the film revolves three sisters who seem to live an ordinary life but lives in their own different ways, but memories shook everything. It had its premiere at 25th Busan International Film Festival in October, 2020 and was released theatrically on January 27, 2021 in South Korea. The film has won 12 awards at different award ceremonies.

Cast
 Moon So-ri as Mi-yeon
 Kim Sun-young as Mi
 Jang Yoon-ju as Miok
 Jo Han-chul as Dong-wook
 Hyun Bong-sik as Sang-joon
 Kim Ga-hee as Bo-mi
 Lim Hye-young as Hyo-jeong
 Jang Dae-woong as Seong-woon
 Lee Bong-ryun as Supermarket lady
 Cha Mi-kyung as Mother

Release
Three Sisters had its premiere at 25th Busan International Film Festival in October, 2020 and was released theatrically on January 27, 2021 in South Korea.

The film was invited at 20th New York Asian Film Festival in Frontlines section. It was screened on August 18, 2021 at Lincoln Center. It was also part of 2021 Vancouver International Film Festival in  'Gateway' section, where it was first screened in October 2021. It was also screened at 10th Korean Film Festival Frankfurt on October 24, 2021.

Home media
The film was made available for streaming on IPTV (KT olleh TV, SK B tv, LG U+TV), Home Choice, Google Play, TVING, Naver TV and KakaoPage. It is also available through KT SkyLife and Cinefox platforms from February 23, 2021.

Reception

Box office
The film was released on January 27, 2021 on 569 screens.

 it is at 25th place among all the Korean films released in the year 2021, with gross of US$593,270 and 83,678 admissions.

Critical response
Panos Kotzathanasis reviewing for HanCinema praised the performance of Kim Sun-young, Moon So-ri and Jang Yoon-ju. Kotzathanasis appreciated the cinematography and in conclusion wrote, "Three Sisters communicates its messages about the consequences of trauma convincingly, while not many faults can be found neither in direction and acting, nor to the production values. The only thing that actually prevents the film from becoming great is the  transition, which could have been handled much better. As a whole, however, definitely deserves a watch."

Jung Yu-jin of News 1 praising the performance said, "the three actors, Moon So-ri, Kim Seon-young, and Jang Yoon-joo, is unparalleled." Jung praised the direction saying, "the director's detailed directing ability, which portrays the universal and mundane subject of domestic violence in a sympathetic way through the lives of three sisters who seem ordinary and unusual." 
Rhythm Zaveri reviewing for Asian Movie Pulse appreciated the cinematography saying, "cinematography makes some interesting choices, giving each sister a distinct look with the lightning and lensing". He criticized the way transition between flash back and present, he opined, "more precise directorial vision in this matter, or even a more thought-out edit [was required]." Concluding Zaveri praised the performance of ensemble of Kim Sun-young, Moon So-ri and Jang Yoon-ju and wrote, "Outside of these small niggles, Three Sisters certainly has its merits and deserves a watch, specially to marvel at the performances from its three excellent female leads and the subtlety with which it manages to encompass complicated themes into the narrative effortlessly."

Awards and nominations

References

External links
 
 
 
 

2020 films
2020s Korean-language films
South Korean drama films
Little Big Pictures films
2020 drama films
Films about sisters